Phoberus brincki is a species of hide beetle in the subfamily Troginae.

References

brincki
Beetles described in 1958